Ulrich Czermak (born 5 September 1967) is a German modern pentathlete. He competed at the 1992 Summer Olympics.

References

External links
 

1967 births
Living people
German male modern pentathletes
Olympic modern pentathletes of Germany
Modern pentathletes at the 1992 Summer Olympics
People from Marktredwitz
Sportspeople from Upper Franconia